Maharjan, is one of the Hindu Buddhist Newar castes or groups of Nepal, predominantly from Patan, Kirtipur, Bhaktapur and Kathmandu in Kathmandu Valley.. They are a major subgroup of the Jyapu ज्यापू: community inside the Newar community. Maharjan people along with the other subgroups of the same community are also known as Jyapus.

Introduction
In Newari or Nepal Bhasa the word Jyapu comes from the word "Jya ya Fu" meaning someone who is competent in the prescribed work. The Jyapus are believed to be the true indigenous people of Kathmandu valley.

Jyapu community is the concoction of various earlier dynasties that once ruled the valley like the Gopalas, Ahir Gupta, Kirat, and Licchavis. Meaning the Jyapu culture and traditions is a kind of merge between Indo-Aryan civilization and Mongoloid Kirat Civilization.

History
The Thakuri Kings, after defeating the Lichhavis, deprived any individual of the previous dynasty in any political and military practice or power. As all the administrative and military jobs were denied to Lichhavis after their defeat, they were forced to take on other occupations apart from politics and the army.

Accordingly, the Licchavis were compelled to mingle with the citizens already consisting of the descendants of Kirats, Ahirs, and Gopalas to avoid extinction. The Kirats, Ahir, and the Gopalas were already involved in the occupation of farming with the integration of Licchavis, it resulted in the formation of the agriculturist Jyapu community.

Finally, after the strong implementation of Varnasram in the Malla period by Jayasthiti Malla, the Jyapu community was incorporated as simple Peasants.

Traditions, culture and organization
Maharjans along with other subgroups of Jyapus live in a community called "Tols" in the major cities of the valley. Distinctly, there are 32 Tols in Kathmandu, 23 in Patan, and Bhaktpur.

All the resident Tols of Jyapu have the main deity usually a mother goddess or a Bhairavs locally known as "Ajima" and "Aju". "Ajima" in Newari means grandmother and "Ajus" means grandfather signifying the close relation of this ethnic group their faith.

Maharjans along with other Jyapu communities have an administrative organization called Guthi. Guthi is responsible to not only handle and administer all activities of the main deity's temple but all ethnic specified rituals required from birth to death.

Although they follow both Hinduism and Vajrayana Buddhism, remnants of old Pre-Vedic nature worship can also be found in their traditions. For any traditional and mainstream religious event and rituals, they rely on the Vajracharya or Gubhajus as priests, but for purely Hindu rituals Rajopadhyaya Brahmins are also given a priestly seat.

Jyapus are also masters of their ancient and purely local instrument called Dhimay and many other instruments. Various religious hymns, ragas, folk songs can be credited to them this community. A special pre-Vedic deity called "Naahsa Dya" is worshipped by this community for all their works related to music.

The Jyapu community is known as the backbone of Newar cultures and traditions and credited for their preservation through practice. They along with other Newar sub-groups have a prominent role in all the Jatras and festivals.

See also
Newar
Newar Buddhism
Prajapati
Tuladhar
Dangol
Vajracharya

References

External links
 About the fusion of Newar religion, art and culture.
 About the different types of script
 Jyapus

Newar caste system
Social groups of Nepal
People from Kathmandu
Newari-language surnames
Surnames of Nepalese origin